Jaywant Gangaram Awale (born 6 July 1940, Ichalkaranji) was a member of the 15th Lok Sabha of India. He represented Latur constituency of Maharashtra and is a member of the Indian National Congress political party.

Political career 
He started his political career in Ichalkaranji. He served as an M.L.A. for five times in the Maharashtra Legislative Assembly from Vadgaon Vidhan Sabha Constituency from 1980–2004, winning elections in 1980, 1985, 1990, 1995 and 1999. He was made Minister of Social Justice in November 1999 in the Vilasrao Deshmukh government. Awale is also serving as a member of Maharashtra State Co-Operative Bank.

References

Living people
Indian National Congress politicians
People from Maharashtra
People from Ichalkaranji
India MPs 2009–2014
People from Latur
Marathi politicians
Maharashtra MLAs 1999–2004
Maharashtra MLAs 1980–1985
1940 births
Lok Sabha members from Maharashtra
People from Marathwada
Indian National Congress politicians from Maharashtra